Poli is a given name. People with the name include:

 Poli Díaz (born 1967), Spanish boxer
 Poli Genova (born 1987), Bulgarian musical artist
 Poli Karastoyanova(born 1969), Bulgarian politician and economist
 Poli Marichal (born 1956), Puerto Rican artist

Unisex given names
Bulgarian feminine given names